Ivan Cvjetković (born 2 January 1960) is a retired Croatian international footballer.

Club career
Ivan started his career in the Yugoslav First League in 1982, playing in the Bosnian club Sloboda Tuzla. In 1984, he made a big move to the Croatian giants Dinamo Zagreb, where he will stay almost four seasons until January 1988, the only exception was the half season spend in Serbian club FK Rad. Then he moved abroad to Belgium to play in Sint-Truidense VV, where he will stay until January 1991. Then, he returned to Croatia, now already independent, and signed for Prva HNL club Inter Zaprešić. He also played for Segesta Sisak before returning, in January 1994, to Dinamo Zagreb, called in that period Croatia Zagreb. He finished his playing career in another Croatian club Hrvatski Dragovoljac.

International career
Cvjetković made his debut for Croatia in an October 1990 friendly match against the United States and earned a total of 3 caps, scoring 1 goal. His final international was a June 1991 friendly away against Slovenia. Since Croatia was still officially part of Yugoslavia at the time, all games were unofficial.

References

External links
 

1960 births
Living people
People from Vukovar-Srijem County
Association football forwards
Yugoslav footballers
Croatian footballers
Croatia international footballers
FK Sloboda Tuzla players
GNK Dinamo Zagreb players
FK Rad players
Sint-Truidense V.V. players
NK Inter Zaprešić players
HNK Segesta players
NK Hrvatski Dragovoljac players
Yugoslav First League players
Belgian Pro League players
Croatian Football League players
Yugoslav expatriate footballers
Expatriate footballers in Belgium
Yugoslav expatriate sportspeople in Belgium